The Intel Play product line, developed and jointly marketed by Intel and Mattel, was a product line of consumer "toy" electronic devices. The other toys were the Digital Movie Creator, the Computer Sound Morpher, and the Me2Cam.

The Intel Play product line was discontinued on March 29, 2002 when it was purchased by Tim Hall's holding company Prime Entertainment. Hall founded Digital Blue, which continued the Intel Play product line under the Digital Blue brand. The "Play" logo of Intel Play became a staple of 2K Play in 2007.

QX3 Computer Microscope

The QX3 Computer Microscope was a product in the Intel Play product line and was continued in the Digital Blue product line. The upgraded QX5 model was available.

The QX3 is a small electronic microscope that can connect to a computer via a USB connection. It has magnification levels of 10x, 60x, and 200x. The microscope comes with software which allows a computer to access the microscope and use it to either take pictures or record movie. The specimen can be lit either from underneath or from above by one of two incandescent bulbs (3.5V, 300mA). The specimen platform is adjustable to focus the image. The Vision CPiA (VV0670P001) is interfaced to a CIF CCD sensor, sampled at a resolution of 320x240 pixels.

QX5 Computer Microscope
The QX5 Computer Microscope is a Digital Blue product and upgraded the QX3 with multiple improvements, including a 640x480 image capture device and brighter light source.

Digital Movie Creator

The Digital Movie Creator was a product in the Intel Play product line and was continued in the Digital Blue product line. The upgraded 2.0 and 3.0 was available. Intel Play Digital Movie Creator is featured as an easy-to-use digital video camera and movie-making software package that allows children to use the PC to script and star in their own feature movies. At the time of development and release in 2001, the goal of the Intel Play products is to extend the value and utility of powerful PCs, like ones based on the Intel® Pentium® 4 processor.

References

External links
 QX3 Support Page
 QX3 Download Finder: Drivers and Software Page
 QX3 Manual by Brian Ford
 QX3 Tutorials at Marly Cain's Amazing Micronautic Adventures
 QX3 Microscope Tutorials at Molecular Expressions
 QX3 Review by Microscopy UK
 DigiBlue Downloads Page
 Linux drivers and technical information

Play
Mattel
2000s toys